Bebek is a village in the Adıyaman District, Adıyaman Province, Turkey. The village is populated by Kurds of the Şikakî tribe and had a population of 349 in 2021.

The hamlets of Çömlekçi, Ekinciler and Yeşilce are attached to the village.

References

Villages in Adıyaman District
Kurdish settlements in Adıyaman Province